Jesse Burnett (born February 8, 1946) is an American former professional boxer. His professional record was 23-18-2 with 11 knockouts. He is best remembered as the spoiler who won a twelve round decision in a WBC cruiserweight elimination bout over former world light-heavyweight champion Victor Galindez of Argentina in 1980, sending Galindez into retirement. In Burnett's two tries at a world title, he was stopped in the ninth round of a 1977 vacant WBC light-heavyweight title bout by Miguel Angel Cuello, and stopped in the eighth round of a 1983 WBC cruiserweight title bout against S.T. Gordon. Burnett also fought such other fighters as former heavyweight champion Leon Spinks, former light-heavyweight champion John Conteh (Burnett earned a ten round draw), former light-heavyweight champion Eddie Mustafa Muhammad, and other contenders such as Yaqui Lopez, James Scott, Jerry Martin, Tony Mundine, Bash Ali, Willie Edwards, Mustafa Wassaja, Willie Edwards, Lotte Mwale, and many others.

Professional boxing record

|-
|align="center" colspan=8|23 Wins (11 knockouts, 12 decisions), 18 Losses (4 knockouts, 14 decisions), 2 Draws 
|-
| align="center" style="border-style: none none solid solid; background: #e3e3e3"|Result
| align="center" style="border-style: none none solid solid; background: #e3e3e3"|Record
| align="center" style="border-style: none none solid solid; background: #e3e3e3"|Opponent
| align="center" style="border-style: none none solid solid; background: #e3e3e3"|Type
| align="center" style="border-style: none none solid solid; background: #e3e3e3"|Round
| align="center" style="border-style: none none solid solid; background: #e3e3e3"|Date
| align="center" style="border-style: none none solid solid; background: #e3e3e3"|Location
| align="center" style="border-style: none none solid solid; background: #e3e3e3"|Notes
|-align=center
|Loss
|
|align=left| Anthony Davis
|UD
|12
|16/05/1984
|align=left| Las Vegas, Nevada, U.S.
|align=left|
|-
|Loss
|
|align=left| S.T. Gordon
|TKO
|8
|16/02/1983
|align=left|East Rutherford, New Jersey, U.S.
|align=left|
|-
|Loss
|
|align=left| Leon Spinks
|UD
|12
|31/10/1982
|align=left|McAfee, New Jersey, U.S.
|align=left|
|-
|Win
|
|align=left|Steve Aczel
|TKO
|8
|19/02/1982
|align=left|Brisbane, Queensland, Australia
|align=left|
|-
|Loss
|
|align=left| Willie Edwards
|PTS
|10
|16/01/1982
|align=left|Detroit, Michigan, U.S.
|align=left|
|-
|Loss
|
|align=left| James Williams
|SD
|10
|13/10/1981
|align=left| Stateline, Nevada, U.S.
|align=left|
|-
|Win
|
|align=left|Tony Mundine
|PTS
|12
|04/03/1981
|align=left|Auckland, New Zealand
|align=left|
|-
|Loss
|
|align=left|Bash Ali
|SD
|12
|03/12/1980
|align=left|Anaheim, California, U.S.
|align=left|
|-
|Win
|
|align=left| T.C. Bowman
|TKO
|6
|15/07/1980
|align=left|Anaheim, California, U.S.
|align=left|
|-
|Win
|
|align=left| Victor Galindez
|UD
|12
|14/06/1980
|align=left|Anaheim, California, U.S.
|align=left|
|-
|Loss
|
|align=left| Dale Grant
|KO
|7
|19/04/1980
|align=left| Billings, Montana, U.S.
|align=left|
|-
|Loss
|
|align=left| Lottie Mwale
|PTS
|12
|04/03/1980
|align=left| London, England
|align=left|
|-
|Win
|
|align=left| Clarence Geigger
|PTS
|10
|14/12/1979
|align=left|Costa Mesa, California, U.S.
|align=left|
|-
|Loss
|
|align=left| Eddie Taylor
|PTS
|10
|24/11/1979
|align=left| Bloomington, Minnesota, U.S.
|align=left|
|-
|Loss
|
|align=left| Jerry Martin
|UD
|12
|14/11/1979
|align=left| Philadelphia, Pennsylvania, U.S.
|align=left|
|-
|Draw
|
|align=left| John Conteh
|PTS
|10
|19/04/1979
|align=left| London, England
|align=left|
|-
|Win
|
|align=left| Juan de la Garza
|TKO
|6
|28/11/1978
|align=left| Billings, Montana, U.S.
|align=left|
|-
|Loss
|
|align=left| Pete McIntyre
|SD
|10
|08/11/1978
|align=left|Stockton, California, U.S.
|align=left|
|-
|Loss
|
|align=left| Yaqui Lopez
|MD
|15
|02/07/1978
|align=left|Stockton, California, U.S.
|align=left|
|-
|Loss
|
|align=left|Mustafa Wasajja
|PTS
|10
|25/05/1978
|align=left|Copenhagen, Denmark
|align=left|
|-
|Loss
|
|align=left| Eddie Mustafa Muhammad
|TKO
|10
|15/02/1978
|align=left| Las Vegas, Nevada, U.S.
|align=left|
|-
|Win
|
|align=left| Lonnie Bennett
|TKO
|6
|18/11/1977
|align=left| Las Vegas, Nevada, U.S.
|align=left|
|-
|Loss
|
|align=left| Miguel Angel Cuello
|TKO
|9
|21/05/1977
|align=left|Monte Carlo, Monaco
|align=left|
|-
|Win
|
|align=left| Al Bolden
|KO
|10
|20/03/1977
|align=left|Tokyo, Japan
|align=left|
|-
|Win
|
|align=left| Bobby Rascon
|TKO
|4
|19/12/1976
|align=left|Tokyo, Japan
|align=left|
|-
|Win
|
|align=left| Eddie Jones
|UD
|10
|10/07/1976
|align=left|San Diego, California, U.S.
|align=left|
|-
|Win
|
|align=left| Willie Taylor
|PTS
|10
|03/06/1976
|align=left| Copenhagen, Denmark
|align=left|
|-
|Win
|
|align=left|Tony Mundine
|KO
|6
|14/05/1976
|align=left|Brisbane, Australia
|align=left|
|-
|Win
|
|align=left| Danny Brewer
|KO
|7
|03/05/1976
|align=left|Stockton, California, U.S.
|align=left|
|-
|Loss
|
|align=left| Victor Galindez
|SD
|10
|08/04/1976
|align=left| Copenhagen, Denmark
|align=left|
|-
|Win
|
|align=left| Danny Brewer
|KO
|3
|28/11/1975
|align=left|Edmonton, Alberta, Canada
|align=left|
|-
|Loss
|
|align=left| Yaqui Lopez
|SD
|12
|24/09/1975
|align=left|Stockton, California, U.S.
|align=left|
|-
|Win
|
|align=left| Yaqui Lopez
|SD
|12
|31/07/1975
|align=left|Stockton, California, U.S.
|align=left|
|-
|Loss
|
|align=left| James Scott
|UD
|10
|25/02/1975
|align=left|Miami Beach, Florida, U.S.
|align=left|
|-
|Win
|
|align=left| Ray White
|KO
|8
|15/03/1974
|align=left|San Diego, California, U.S.
|align=left|
|-
|Win
|
|align=left| Felton Marshall
|TD
|9
|09/08/1973
|align=left|Los Angeles, California, U.S.
|align=left|
|-
|Win
|
|align=left| Jimmy Lester
|PTS
|10
|08/02/1973
|align=left|Los Angeles, California, U.S.
|align=left|
|-
|Win
|
|align=left|Ron Wilson
|PTS
|10
|19/10/1972
|align=left|Los Angeles, California, U.S.
|align=left|
|-
|Win
|
|align=left| Hildo Silva
|PTS
|6
|24/07/1972
|align=left|Inglewood, California, U.S.
|align=left|
|-
|Win
|
|align=left| Yaqui Lopez
|PTS
|8
|01/07/1972
|align=left|Stockton, California, U.S.
|align=left|
|-
|Win
|
|align=left|Steve Stark
|KO
|4
|05/06/1972
|align=left|San Diego, California, U.S.
|align=left|
|-
|Win
|
|align=left| Angel Baggini
|PTS
|6
|24/04/1972
|align=left|Inglewood, California, U.S.
|align=left|
|-
|Draw
|
|align=left| Cisco Solorio
|TD
|1
|13/04/1972
|align=left|Los Angeles, California, U.S.
|align=left|
|}

References 

Boxers from California
1946 births
Living people
American male boxers
Light-heavyweight boxers